Celebrity Big Brother 2011, also known as Celebrity Big Brother 8, was the eighth series of the British reality television series Celebrity Big Brother. It was the first series of Celebrity Big Brother to air on Channel 5, and the first celebrity series not to air in January since Celebrity Big Brother 2, which was broadcast in November 2002. The series launched on 18 August 2011, and ended after 22 days on 8 September 2011, making it the shortest Channel 5 series. It was followed by the twelfth regular series, which launched the following night after the final. Davina McCall did not return to host the main show, and was replaced by former winner Brian Dowling. Emma Willis presented the spin-off show Big Brother's Bit on the Side, alongside Jamie East and Alice Levine. Marcus Bentley returned as commentator for the live shows and highlights whilst also providing voice over for viewer competitions.

In keeping with the celebrity theme, the first edition of OK! TV When Bruv Takes Over aired on 17 August, the eve of the launch night. Following intense press speculation, the exact line-up of celebrity housemates remained a mystery until launch night. For the first time, the celebrity version was staged prior to the main show. Like the previous celebrity series on Channel 4, it was sponsored by Freederm.

The series was won by Irish traveller and reality television star Paddy Doherty, with Kerry Katona as runner-up.

Jedward returned to the house for Celebrity Big Brother 19 as All-Stars, representing this series. They finished as runners-up to Coleen Nolan.

Pre-series

Presenters
Former Big Brother winner Brian Dowling replaced Davina McCall as the presenter of the show. Emma Willis was presenter of new spin-off show Big Brother's Bit on the Side. Marcus Bentley retained his role as off-screen narrator for the highlights shows. He also commentated on the live nights and provided voice-overs for the viewer competitions.

Trailers
From 23 July 2011, trailers announcing the imminent return of the series were aired on Channel 5 voiced by Marcus Bentley. Former housemates that featured in one of the trailers included Josie Gibson, Dowling and Sam Pepper. This coincided with the launch of the new eye logo for 2011. In the run-up to Celebrity Big Brother, the channel heavily featured a promotional campaign under the slogan "When Bruv Takes Over" based on the David Guetta and Kelly Rowland song "When Love Takes Over". It featured a large cast of past housemates dancing and miming in the streets, finally meeting up in a park with CGI effects adding a fly-past with coloured smoke overhead.

Live feed
With varying controversy, there was no 24-hour live feed in Celebrity Big Brother 2011 unlike most years on Channel 4. Channel 5 concentrated on the daily highlights shows, the eviction shows and instead placed clips from action in the house on a dedicated website and social media.

Title sequence
The main motif for the show's titles was a space-age-style, revolving 3D glowing eye. As usual the title sequence was kept secret until the launch. For the first time in the show's history, housemates were included in the title sequences, showing various parts of their face/top part of body. The on-screen graphics and highlights editing were the show's most biggest change to date with names superimposed over the housemates and music used in every scene. In between the highlights, the show flashed up clips portraits of the housemates' faces.

House
On 10 August, Digital Spy published its first look at the new Celebrity Big Brother house for the new Channel 5 series in readiness for the first intake of celebrity housemates. It revealed a colourful, opulent look with a return to the luxury feel of the early Channel 4 series. It featured a bar, gym, sauna, an open-plan bathroom, the UK series' largest swimming pool thus far. In the celebrity series, the shower enclosure was screened off from public view but this was changed to a clear view for the main series. There was also a large outdoor area and a sophisticated range of designer furnishings and fittings. This made a radical contrast with the shift to an austere, claustrophobic house seen in the later Channel 4 series.

Cameras and surveillance system
The housemates were watched by a network of 47 cameras 24/7, the largest number of cameras to date. The show was broadcast in high-definition for the first time in its history. In preparation for HDTV broadcast standard, the house was illuminated with a super-bright overhead lighting rig.

Diary Room
On 15 August 2011, viewers were shown the Big Brother 2011 diary chair. It was in the style of a luxury club chair in deep red with gold trim. The luxurious feel was enhanced by a dramatic entrance way to the diary room with strip lighting and mirrored surfaces. In a break with the original convention of no contact with the outside world, during visits to the diary room, housemates were invited to answer trivia questions contributed by Facebook members during the spin-off show, Big Brother's Bit on the Side on 5*. They also received messages from relatives and visits from pets. The diary room led to the small task room where challenges were set for the housemates.

Launch night
The show went live on 18 August.  A group of ten initial housemates entered the house through the big eye via a catwalk leading up to a flight of steps, crossing a swingbridge shaped like the Big Brother eye. Marcus Bentley narrated each contestant's details as they made their entrance. Kerry Katona was announced as the first celebrity housemate to enter the new Big Brother house followed by American Pie actress Tara Reid Reality TV stars Paddy Doherty from My Big Fat Gypsy Wedding and Amy Childs from ITV 2's The Only Way Is Essex joined them. Australian paparazzi and media personality Darryn Lyons was next to join the house followed by Sally Bercow. British actor Lucien Laviscount was next with ex Baywatch actress Pamela Bach preceding him. British model Bobby Sabel was next, with Irish pop duo Jedward the last to enter the house.

Launch night twist
Following the housemates' entrance into the house, Big Brother called one housemate to the Diary Room. Kerry Katona took up the offer and in the process nominated herself for a secret task. Her mission was to become the 'biggest celebrity diva' which entailed three mini tasks. Her first task was to throw an "A-list" celebrity-style tantrum, second to ask three housemates, "do you know who I am?", thirdly, to demand to swap beds and then swap back. The next day, the housemates voted for whom they judged to be the biggest diva in the house. Kerry had to be selected or she would be punished. Kerry failed as Jedward were selected as the biggest divas in the house. She was told that her punishment was to face the public vote for eviction and she also had to nominate two other of her housemates to join her for eviction. She nominated Bobby and Sally. The further twist was that the public voted to save Kerry, Bobby or Sally. The loser was Sally, who had the fewest votes to save and was evicted at the first eviction show on Day 9.

Press reaction
The media gave the relaunched show a mixed reaction. Michael Hogan of The Telegraph claimed that many of the housemates are "notable only for who  they married or for taking part in other reality shows".

Sister shows

Celebrity Big Brother's Bit on the Side
This is the main spin-off show for Big Brother. In this series it was hosted by Emma Willis with co-hosts Jamie East and Alice Levine. The first edition followed the launch night show at 10:30pm on Thursday 18 August with the celebrities in the house and the first task set. Lauren Harries acted as fashion expert on the launch night show, castigating the styling of the new housemates. The show was similar to ex-spin off shows Big Brother's Little Brother and Big Brother's Big Mouth, but is shown after the main show. The debut show was watched by 1.82 million viewers (receiving 13.4%). It returned along with the ninth series of the main celebrity show in January 2012.

OK! TV: When Bruv Takes Over
This is a special edition of the main OK! TV magazine show broadcast from the Big Brother compound in the Elstree Studio. The first edition aired on Wednesday 17 August where viewers were given a preview of the new Big Brother house on the eve of the launch of Celebrity Big Brother 2011. The show is presented by Jenny Frost and Jeff Brazier.

New features
The main elements of the classic Big Brother format have remained in place since the shift to Channel 5. Narrator Marcus Bentley has taken on a more prominent role in the live shows by contributing narration to the opening titles and doing voiceovers to the entrance and exits of the housemates. He has also adopted a more animated vocal style since the move. New presenter Brian Dowling also introduced some innovations of his own. On eviction nights, he uses the new catchphrase, "[housemates up for eviction], your time has come!"

Housemates

Amy Childs
Amy Childs (born 7 June 1990) is a British reality television star and model, best known for appearing in the ITV2 semi-reality programme The Only Way Is Essex, for the first two series. During her time, she flirted with fellow housemate Lucien, and developed rivalry against Kerry. On Day 22, Childs left the house in fourth place.

Bobby Sabel
Bobby Sabel is a British fashion model. Sabel has modelled in New York and Paris, which he is currently signed to Elite Model Management. On Day 22, Bobby was the first housemate to be evicted on finale night, finishing in seventh place.

Darryn Lyons
Darryn Lyons (born 19 August 1965) is an Australian paparazzo, media personality and entrepreneur, best known for his paparazzi work in Britain. He has worked for newspaper firms such as News of the World and the Daily Mail. Lyons gained widespread media attention when he sold a photograph, which was used to support a claim that David Beckham was having an affair with his personal assistant Rebecca Loos. On Day 2, he celebrated his 46th birthday in the House, after the housemates passed a task. As a reward, the housemates threw a paparazzi-themed party for him. On Day 22, he was the second evictee on finale night, finishing in sixth place.

Jedward
Jedward (born John & Edward Grimes; 16 October 1991) are an Irish identical twin singing duo, who rose to fame appearing as finalists on the sixth series on The X Factor. They also competed as Ireland's participation in the Eurovision Song Contest 2011. On Day 22, Jedward were announced to have finished in third place.

Kerry Katona
Kerry Katona (born 6 September 1980) is a British media personality and singer. She began her career as a member of the girl band, Atomic Kitten from
1998 to 2001. After her departure from the band, Katona became the face of reality television, winning the third series of I'm a Celebrity...Get Me Out of Here! and appearing on Dancing on Ice. On Day 1, Kerry was the first housemate to enter the House, and was set a secret task to become the "biggest diva". She later failed, and as punishment, was automatically nominated for the first eviction. During her time in the house, she developed a showmance with Lucien, and a rivalry against Amy. On Day 20, she celebrated her 31st birthday in the House. On Day 22, she was the runner-up of the series.

Lucien Laviscount
Lucien Laviscount (born 9 June 1992) is a British actor and model, most famous for playing Ben Richardson in the ITV soap opera, Coronation Street and Jonah Kirby in the BBC drama, Waterloo Road. He once appeared in a M&S advert as a child alongside David Beckham. During his time in the house, he developed showmances with Amy and Kerry. On Day 22, he was evicted from the house, positioning fifth.

Paddy Doherty
Patrick "Paddy" Doherty (born 6 February 1959) is an Irish traveller, bare-knuckle fighter and television personality, who featured on Danny Dyer's Deadliest Men and the 2010 Channel 4 programme My Big Fat Gypsy Wedding. Doherty made it to the final and was crowned the winner of the series on Day 22, beating Kerry Katona.

Pamela Bach-Hasselhoff
Pamela Bach (born Pamela Ann Weissenbach; 16 October 1963), also known as Pamela Bach-Hasselhoff, is an American actress. She gained notoriety from her previous marriage to David Hasselhoff. She worked with her now ex-husband on Baywatch, and had a recurring role as a psychologist in the series Sirens. In the house, she had her own bedroom with ensuite bathroom. Pamela was evicted from the house on Day 14. During her eviction, she was asked to give four housemates immunity from the next eviction. She chose Kerry, Jedward, Amy, and Paddy.

Sally Bercow
Sally Bercow (born Sally Kate Illman; 22 November 1969) is a British political activist and media personality, and the wife of the speaker for the House of Commons, John Bercow. She attracted public criticism when a photograph of her wearing nothing but a bed sheet, and also looking outside to the House of Commons, had appeared in the London Evening Standard newspaper. She was the first celebrity to be evicted on Day 9.

Tara Reid
Tara Reid (born 8 November 1975) is an American actress, best known for her starring roles in The Big Lebowski, the American Pie films and Scrubs. Tara was the third person to be evicted on Day 16.

House guests
Former Harrods owner Mohamed Al-Fayed entered the house as a houseguest on Day 3 and set the celebrity housemates a task based on dressing up as Egyptian mummies.

On the live eviction show of 26 August, Brian Dowling confirmed that the Michelin star-winning celebrity chef and restaurateur Marco Pierre White is visiting the house "to turn up the heat" on Day 10. White set the housemates a cooking task.

On the Day 12 "Fright Night"-themed task, American actors Anton Yelchin and Christopher Mintz-Plasse visited the house to present the winning housemates with tickets for a screening of their film.

On the Final Night, Pamela Anderson entered the house and took her place as celebrity houseguest alongside the main houseguests on Big Brother 2011 which launched the next day.

Summary

Nominations table

Notes

Ratings
The launch show received 5.3 million viewers, a 21.9% launch share, and also peaked at 8 million, winning its time slot. It gave Channel 5 its highest-ever audience outside of sports programmes and films, and one of its top five ratings of all time.

References

External links
Official website

2011 British television seasons
08
Channel 5 (British TV channel) reality television shows